The Flying Dutchman is an American horror film of 2000, directed by Robin P. Murray and starring Catherine Oxenberg, Eric Roberts, and Rod Steiger.

The movie has also been called Frozen in Fear and is a re-working of The Mystery of the Wax Museum (1933) and House of Wax (1953).

It was released on streaming media on September 11, 2001.

Outline
An art buyer in Seattle buys a good painting from an old lady called Moira (Joan Benedict) and offers it to Lacy Anderson (Catherine Oxenberg), a dealer. Lacy is impressed and wants to represent the painter, who lives in a remote cabin by a lake at Dark Hollow, Western Montana, so she and her assistant Polly go there to meet Sean (Eric Roberts). Lacy falls for him, and when they go hiking in the mountains she is concussed, waking up in Sean’s bed. Sean and his friend Ben (Rod Steiger) look after her, and Sean wants Lacy to stay with him, but she plans to go back to Seattle. When Lacy fails to arrive home, Polly goes back to look for her and is captured by Sean. Lacy finds Ben, unhinged, holding Moira at gunpoint. Events from Sean’s childhood are then visited in a flashback: Sean saw his father kill his mother and then himself.

Lacy goes to Sean’s cabin looking for Polly and finds her chained to a table. Sean shows Lacy his ice sculpture "Maternal Ice Tomb", containing three naked women, in an ice house. He is about to kill Lacy when Moira’s friend Ethan arrives, armed with a gun, and stops him. Ethan then sees his missing girlfriend in the ice. Sean tries to kill Ethan, but Lacy gets hold of the gun and shoots Sean several times. Ethan, Polly and Lacy go to tell Moira Sean is dead, but soon Sean’s body disappears, with a trail of blood tracks leading to the lake.

Months later, at home in Seattle, Lacy receives a new painting by Sean, and then gets a phone call from him.

Cast
Catherine Oxenberg as Lacy Anderson
Eric Roberts as Sean
Rod Steiger as Ben
Joan Benedict as Moira
Scott Plank as Ethan
Ellina McCormick as Polly
Gabriel Clark as Vitally
Douglas Sebern as Hans
Barry Sigismondi as Nathaniel
Christi Marsico as Astrid
Brendan Shanahan as Simon
Gillian Todd as Hippie Girl

Reception
When the movie was released on video in 2003 as Frozen in Fear, Sean Abberton’s review for Michael DVD found that Rod Steiger was "the clear stand-out", stealing scenes from younger actors. He found the movie to be "amiably directed and photographed", but nevertheless "let down by a deplorably woeful script and one-dimensional character development".

Film Review gave the video release of 2003 a negative review under the heading "Frozen in Fear – it will leave you cold". It commented Den of Geek also reviewed the movie, calling it "quite possibly the hugest pile of shite anyone could ever have the misfortune to sit through."

Notes

External links
 
"The Flying Dutchman", TV Guide
"The Flying Dutchman trailer", YouTube
"The Flying Dutchman", spacemov.watch

2000 films
2000 horror films
American action horror films
2000s English-language films
2000s American films